Erland Koch (3 January 1867 – 29 April 1945) was a German sport shooter who competed in the 1912 Summer Olympics.

He won the bronze medal in the clay pigeons team event. He also competed in the running deer, single shots event and finished thirteenth. In the running deer, double shots event he finished 17th and in the trap competition he finished twelfth.

He was killed in action during World War II.

References

External links
profile

1867 births
1945 deaths
German male sport shooters
Trap and double trap shooters
Running target shooters
Olympic shooters of Germany
Shooters at the 1912 Summer Olympics
Olympic bronze medalists for Germany
Olympic medalists in shooting
Medalists at the 1912 Summer Olympics
German civilians killed in World War II